This is a partial list of notable past and present faculty members at Texas Tech University.

Architecture

Arts and Sciences

Business

Education

Engineering

Human Sciences

Media & Communication

Visual and Performing Arts

Athletics

References

External links

Faculty
Texas Tech University faculty